A Love is a 2007 South Korean action drama film starring Joo Jin-mo and Park Si-yeon and directed by Kwak Kyung-taek.

Plot
In-ho is a naive but tough teenager, who is trying hard to stay out of trouble, but he willingly sacrifices everything to protect his childhood girlfriend Mi-ju. But their relationship is wrapped in tragedy. The girl is raped as an act of revenge after her mother and brother both die before they settled financial debts with a gang. In-ho retaliates by attacking the rapist, and he and Mi-ju try to escape, but they are thwarted by the gangsters. Mi-ju ends up going to Japan and In-ho goes to jail.

Years later, he finds a job at a steel company and gets scouted by its owner to be his personal secretary and bodyguard. Life gets a little easier for him, until suddenly Mi-ju reappears ― as his boss's mistress.

In-ho has held onto his unwavering love for Mi-ju throughout his prison term and long days of separation, and for Mi-ju, it has always been impossible to forget her beloved In-ho. But the more their love for each other deepens, the more difficult it becomes for the star-crossed lovers to be together.

Cast
 Joo Jin-mo - In-ho
 Park Si-yeon - Mi-ju
 Joo Hyun - Chairman Yoo
 Kim Min-jun - Chi-gwon

References

External links 
  
 
 

2007 films
South Korean action drama films
Films directed by Kwak Kyung-taek
Lotte Entertainment films
2000s Korean-language films
2007 action drama films
2000s South Korean films